Simiskina phalena hayashii is a subspecies of butterfly in the family Lycaenidae. It is found in the Philippines (Bohol, Leyte and Mindanao). The subspecies was first described by Heinz G. Schröder and Colin G. Treadaway in 1979.

References
 Schröder, H., & Treadaway, C. G., 1979: Neue Lepidoptera von den Philippinen. Entomologische Zeitschrift. 89 (24): 268–276, 4 figs.
 Treadaway, Colin G., 1955: Checklist of the butterflies of the Philippine Islands. Nachrichten des Entomologischen Vereins Apollo, Suppl. 14: 7–118.
 

Butterflies described in 1979
Poritiinae
Butterfly subspecies